Katlego Mashigo (born 22 January 2001) is a South African footballer who plays as a midfielder for League of Ireland First Division club Finn Harps.

Career
As a youth player, Mashigo joined the youth academy of Irish side St. Kevin's Boys. In 2017, he joined the youth academy of Fleetwood Town in the English third tier. In 2019, he signed for Irish top flight club Bohemians.

In 2021, Mashigo signed for Athlone Town in the Irish second tier. Before the second half of 2021–22, he signed for Northern Irish team Portadown.

On 1 February 2023, Mashigo joined League of Ireland First Division club Finn Harps.

References

External links
 

2001 births
Association football midfielders
Athlone Town A.F.C. players
Bohemian F.C. players
Expatriate association footballers in Northern Ireland
Expatriate association footballers in the Republic of Ireland
Expatriate footballers in England
Finn Harps F.C. players
League of Ireland players
Living people
Portadown F.C. players
South African expatriate soccer players
South African expatriate sportspeople in England
South African soccer players
Waterford F.C. players